Gudur is a town in Tirupati district of the Indian state of Andhra Pradesh. It is a municipality and the headquarters of Gudur mandal and Gudur revenue division.

Demographics 
The total population constitute,  males,  females and  children, in the age group of 0–6 years. The average literacy rate stands at 71.07% with  literates.

Geography 

Climate

The climate here is tropical. The summers here have a good deal of rainfall, while the winters have very little. This location is classified as Aw by Köppen and Geiger. In Gudur, the average annual temperature is 29.2 °C. About 1025 mm of precipitation falls annually.

Governance 

Civic administration

The municipality was established in the year 1954. The urban agglomeration of the town consists of Gudur municipality and its out growths. The out growths include Guduru (east), Guduru (west), Chennuru–II, Nellatur, Chillakur.

Politics

Gudur is a part of Gudur (SC) (Assembly constituency) for Andhra Pradesh Legislative Assembly. Present MLA name is Varaprasad Rao Velagapalli from YSRCP.

Transport 

National Highway 16 passes through the town, which connects Kolkata and Chennai. The Andhra Pradesh State Road Transport Corporation operates bus services from Gudur bus station.  is a major railway junction, which connects Howrah-Chennai main line and Renigunta branch line. It is classified as an A–category station and recognised as an Adarsh station in the Vijayawada railway division of South Central Railway zone.

Education 
The primary and secondary school education is imparted by government, aided and private schools, under the School Education Department of the state. The medium of instruction followed by different schools are Telugu, Urdu, Hindi and English.

Business

Gudur Lemon Market
Lemon business is the most unbeaten business in Gudur. Gudur's lemon market is one of the largest lemon markets in Andhra Pradesh. The lemon market is located at Gudur town on the way of Chennur. Gudur and the surrounding villages' farmers mostly prefer to farm lemon trees. They export lemons around the country and also to other countries.
Usually lemon is sold in two prominent methods in Gudur, i.e. Pieces and Bundles (contains more than 1000 lb).
Pricing is based on the season and demand and varies every day.

Mica 
Mica mining is a prominent business in Gudur.

Mica Belts around Gudur is considered as second largest in India. Mica belts covering nearly 1000 km2 around Gudur. The following are the types of Mica found in Gudur i.e. Quartz, Feldspar, Muscovite and Vermiculite.

One of the first firms to start mica trading at a large scale was Laxmi Mica Industries - Gudur under the leadership of Late Sri Lal Khatuwala. The largest deposit of Mica in India was at Koderma, Jharkhand and second largest is at Gudur. At a time when there was 19 mica mines, Laxmi Mica Industries was having contract to outright purchase all the stocks from 18 mines. The two firms Birdhichand Bansidhar and Laxmi Mica Industries are the top mica exporters of India.

Some of the other mica firms were: 
Micamin Exports - Gudur
Premier Mica Company - Gudur
Microfine Mica Company - Gudur
Micafab - Gudur
Krishna Mica Company - Gudur
Yashoda Krishna Mica Mining Co. - Gudur
Venkatagiri Raja Mining Co. - Gudur
KHR Mica company - Gudur

Aquaculture
Aquaculture is also one of the successful business in Gudur,
There are many Prawn Ponds are located around Gudur. Usually two main types of prawn forms being done, those are Scampi and Tiger Prawns, water and weather in this area are suitable to mainly these two types.
Prawn exports around India and also some other countries from Gudur.

Notable people 
Balli Kalyanachakravarthy (born 1984), member of the Andhra Pradesh Legislative Council

References 

Towns in Tirupati district